Derek Robert Law (born September 14, 1990) is an American professional baseball pitcher in the Cincinnati Reds organization. He has previously played in Major League Baseball (MLB) for the San Francisco Giants, Toronto Blue Jays, Minnesota Twins, and Detroit Tigers.

Amateur career
Law attended Seton-La Salle Catholic High School in Pittsburgh, Pennsylvania, and played for the school's baseball team. He was a two-time Pittsburgh All-Area baseball selection (2008 and 2009), The Texas Rangers selected Law in the 28th round of the 2009 Major League Baseball draft, but he did not sign. Law attended Miami Dade College. In his sophomore year at Miami Dade, Law posted an 8–5 win–loss record with a 2.35 earned run average (ERA) while striking out 121 batters in 92 innings pitched.

Professional career

San Francisco Giants
The San Francisco Giants selected Law in the ninth round of the 2011 Major League Baseball draft, and he signed with the Giants. He made his professional debut with the Arizona League Giants in 2011. In 15 games he had a 2.50 ERA with 19 strikeouts over 18 innings pitched. In 2012, he pitched for the Augusta GreenJackets, posting a 2.91 ERA with 67 strikeouts over  innings.

Law spent the 2013 season pitching for the GreenJackets, AZL Giants and San Jose Giants. He finished the year with 2.31 ERA, 14 saves and 102 strikeouts over  innings. At San Jose, Law struck out 45 hitters while only walking one hitter. Prior to the 2014 season, he was invited to the Giants spring training, where he has competed for a spot in the Giants Opening Day bullpen.

In 2014, Law pitched for the Double-A Richmond Flying Squirrels, recording 13 saves in 14 opportunities and striking out 29 in 28 innings pitched.  Law underwent Tommy John surgery in June 2014 and did not return until June 2015. Law was added to the Giants' 40-man roster in November 2014 to protect him from the Rule 5 draft. In 2015, Law recorded 32 strikeouts in 25 innings for the Flying Squirrels.

Law started the 2016 season with the Triple-A Sacramento River Cats.

Law was called up to the San Francisco Giants on April 15, 2016, to replace the injured Sergio Romo. Law made his major league debut in a game later that day against the Los Angeles Dodgers. He entered the game in the bottom of the seventh inning and allowed one hit while striking out three batters.

On May 7, Law earned his first major league victory by holding the Colorado Rockies scoreless in one inning of relief. On June 13, Law pitched  scoreless innings against the Milwaukee Brewers to record his first major league save. In 61 games, he posted an ERA of 2.13 in 55 innings.

The following season, he struggled with inconsistency, posting an ERA of 5.06 in  innings. In 2018, he only appeared in 7 games for the Giants, spending most of his time in the AAA level.

Toronto Blue Jays
Law was designated for assignment on February 1, 2019, following the waiver claim of John Andreoli and outrighted on February 10. On April 2, 2019, the Giants traded Law, Alen Hanson, and Juan De Paula to the Toronto Blue Jays for Kevin Pillar. He was called up from the Triple A Buffalo Bisons on May 3. Law was non-tendered by the Blue Jays on December 2, making him a free agent.

Texas Rangers
On January 30, 2020, Law signed a minor league deal with the Texas Rangers. He became a free agent on November 2, 2020.

Minnesota Twins
On November 23, 2020, Law announced on Twitter that he had signed a minor league contract with the Minnesota Twins organization. On May 8, 2021, Law was selected to the active roster. After recording an 8.53 ERA in 5 games, Law was designated for assignment on May 18, 2021. He was outrighted to the Triple-A St. Paul Saints on May 20. On July 1, Law was re-selected to the active roster. Law was again designated for assignment by the Twins on September 5, after Luke Farrell was activated off of the injured list. Law made 9 appearances for the Twins in 2021, recording a 4.20 ERA with 14 strikeouts. On October 4, Law elected free agency.

Detroit Tigers 
On April 9, 2022, Law signed a minor league contract with the Detroit Tigers organization. Law was assigned Rookie-Level FCL Tigers East. On April 14, 2022 Law was send to AAA Toledo Mud Hens. The Tigers promoted Law to the major leagues on July 30. Law was designated for assignment by the Tigers on August 5, 2022. He was released on August 7.

Cincinnati Reds
On August 14, 2022 Law signed a minor league contract with the Cincinnati Reds and was assigned to the Triple-A Louisville Bats. He had his contract selected on August 30, 2022. On November 15, Law was designated for assignment. On November 18, he was non-tendered and became a free agent.

On January 23, 2023, Law re-signed with the Reds organization on a minor league contract.

Personal life
His father, Joe Law, played minor league baseball in the Oakland Athletics organization. He was called up to the majors for four days but never appeared in a game, making him a phantom ballplayer.

References

External links

1990 births
Living people
American expatriate baseball players in Canada
Arizona League Giants players
Augusta GreenJackets players
Baseball players from Pittsburgh
Buffalo Bisons (minor league) players
Cincinnati Reds players
Detroit Tigers players
Major League Baseball pitchers
Miami Dade Sharks baseball players
Minnesota Twins players
Richmond Flying Squirrels players
Sacramento River Cats players
San Francisco Giants players
San Jose Giants players
Scottsdale Scorpions players
Toronto Blue Jays players